Embsen is a municipality in the district of Lüneburg, in Niedersachsen, Germany.

References